Cannalidgey is a hamlet  south of Padstow in Cornwall, England. Cannalidgey is in the civil parish of St Issey. It is in the civil parish of St Minver Highlands.

References

Hamlets in Cornwall